Alfonso "Al" Gaba Cusi (born December 4, 1949) is a Filipino businessman from Naujan, Oriental Mindoro who served as the 14th Secretary of Energy under the Duterte administration from 2016 to 2022. He is also the president of PDP–Laban and served in the Arroyo Administration as head of government air and sea transportation agencies from 2001 to 2010. He was the vice chair of PDP–Laban until July 2021, before being elected as its president amid the dispute within the ruling party with the rival faction led by Senators Koko Pimentel and Manny Pacquiao.

Cusi and other Department of Energy officials face graft charges, neglect of duty, and grave misconduct before the Office of the Ombudsman over the buyout of Malampaya Philippines Pte. of 45% Chevron Philippines' stake in the Malampaya gas field in Palawan. Cusi is also facing charges of graft, gross neglect of duty, inefficiency and incompetence in the performance of official duties before the Ombudsman in connection with power rate hikes in the Philippines.

Early life and education 
Cusi was born in the municipality of Capiz (now Roxas City) in the then undivided island province of Capiz. He graduated at the University of St. La Salle in Bacolod (then known as La Salle College Bacolod), earning a Bachelor of Science degree in 1972. He also attended the University of the Philippines Cebu in Cebu City and received a Master of Business Administration in 1976.

Career and businesses 
Cusi started his career in shipping. He joined the Aboitiz Shipping Company (now 2GO Group) in 1973 as Assistant Comptroller. He worked his way up to become the company's and its subsidiaries' Credit Collection Manager, Purchasing Manager, Passage and Stevedorial Manager, and Trucking Manager. By 1977, he was promoted as Assistant to the President, and eventually as Assistant Vice President in 1979, Vice President in 1983, and General Manager and EVP in 1985. He was Senior Vice President and Director before resigning from the company in 1990.

Cusi then ventured into his own shipping, logistics and distribution businesses. He founded the Starlite Ferries which offers roll-on/roll-off ferry service between his home province Mindoro and Batangas, as well as Aklan. He is also the President and founder of Starlite Cargo Xpress. He also entered the retail business with his own chain of convenience stores called Quick Stop.

He was invited to join government service in 2001 as General Manager of the Philippine Ports Authority during the first term of President Gloria Macapagal Arroyo. As head of the port authority, he is credited with having introduced and developed seaport terminals throughout the country. He was also the main project head of the Strong Republic Nautical Highway System of the Arroyo administration. In 2004, Cusi was then assigned by Arroyo to lead the Manila International Airport Authority. As an airport manager, he was responsible for finally opening the long-delayed Ninoy Aquino International Airport Terminal 3 in 2008. 

Cusi then assumed leadership of the Civil Aviation Authority of the Philippines (CAAP) in March 2010.  Cusi resigned from CAAP in December 2010 and returned to his private businesses. He served in the board of Intex Resources Philippines which has a nickel and cobalt mining project in his home province of Oriental Mindoro. He was also involved in Double Concept Investments, Ltd. prior to his return to government service under President Rodrigo Duterte on June 30, 2016.

Controversies

Complaints against media outlets
In 2021, Cusi filed libel and cyberlibel complaints against seven news organizations over their stories on the Malampaya deal, which detailing the graft charges filed against him and businessman Dennis Uy. On June 24, 2022, before his term as Energy Secretary ended, Cusi, through an affidavit of desistance filed in the Taguig City's Prosecutor Office, withdrew these complaints.

References 

|-

1949 births
20th-century Filipino businesspeople
Living people
Secretaries of Energy of the Philippines
PDP–Laban politicians
Heads of government agencies of the Philippines
People from Capiz
University of St. La Salle alumni
University of the Philippines Cebu alumni
Arroyo administration personnel
Benigno Aquino III administration personnel
Duterte administration cabinet members
Recipients of the Presidential Medal of Merit (Philippines)
21st-century Filipino businesspeople